Heart of Georgia Regional Airport  is a public airport located in Eastman, Georgia, United States. It is situated three miles (5 km) east of the city of Eastman.
 
The airport is home to Middle Georgia State University's aviation management programs, which include air traffic control, flight training and mechanic programs.

The air traffic control tower at EZM is only open during school hours: Monday through Thursday 8:00am to 6:00pm, and Friday 8:00am to 12:00 pm.

Facilities 
The Heart of Georgia Regional Airport has one runway:

 Runway 2/20: , surface: asphalt

References

External links 
 

Airports in Georgia (U.S. state)
Buildings and structures in Dodge County, Georgia